A Punjabi Qissa ( (Shahmukhi),  (Gurmukhi); plural: Qisse) is a tradition of Punjabi language oral story-telling that emerged in South Asia with the fusion of local Punjabi people and migrants from the Arabian peninsula and contemporary Iran.
Where Qisse reflect an Islamic and/or Persian heritage of transmitting popular tales of love, valour, honour and moral integrity amongst Muslims, they matured out of the bounds of religion into a more secular form when it reached India and added the existing pre-Islamic Punjabi culture and folklore to its entity.

Etymology
The word Qissa (pronounced ) is an Arabic word meaning "epic legend" or a "folk tale". It occurs as a regular common noun in Indo-Aryan languages like Punjabi, Bengali, Gujarati, Urdu and Hindi. If used informally, the word means an ‘interesting tale’ or ‘fable’.

Qisse and the Punjabi culture

Qisse are attributed to have inspired folk music in Punjabi and have added depth and richness to its delivery. These traditions were passed down generations in oral or written forms and were often recited, told as bedtime stories to children or performed musically as folk songs.

Each qissa, if performed, has its unique requirements. A person able to sing or recite one may not necessarily transmit another. The vocal ranges of the musical scale and accurate pauses, if not performed well, leave a performer breathless and unable to continue. Most of the beats used in modern Punjabi music (often misleadingly labelled Bhangra), originated from qissa tradition and recitations in old times. Qisse also boast to be among the best poetry every written in Punjabi.

Poetry based on Qisse
Waris Shah's (1722–1798) qissa of ‘Heer Ranjha’ (formally known as Qissa ‘Heer’) is among the most famous Qisse of all times. The effect of Qisse on Punjabi culture is so strong that even religious leaders and revolutionaries like Guru Gobind Singh and Baba Farid, etc., quoted famous Qissas in their messages. It will not be wrong to say that popularity and nearly divine status of Qisse in Punjabi actually inspired many generations of spiritual leaders and social activists to combine the message of God with teenage love tales. This gave rise to what is known as the Sufi movement in Punjab region.

The most popular writer/poet to have written Punjabi Sufi Qisse was Bulleh Shah (c.1680-1758). So popular are his Kalams (poems) that he is frequently quoted by young and old alike with same respect and on matters of both love and God. In recent times, South Asian singers have sported these folklores on their albums, for instance, the most famous folklore duo like Kuldeep Manak and Dev Tharike Wala wrote and sang about almost every Qissa, and recently, Rabbi by (Rabbi Shergill) contained ‘Bulla Ki Jaana Main Kaun’, translated in English as ‘I know not who I am’, written by Bulleh Shah. A few years back another singer, (Harbhajan Maan), a Canada-based Punjabi singer rejuvenated the story of ‘Mirza Sahiban’, a work by Peelu. Daim Iqbal Daim from Mandi Bahauddin District, Pakistan also wrote many qissas in Punjabi language like Laila Majnu, Mirza Sahiban, Sohni Mahiwal, Bilal Biti, etc. Daim got popularity by writing "Shah Nama Karbla" and "Kambal Posh".

Notable Qisse

Most of the Punjabi qisse were written by Muslim poets who wandered the land. The oldest were usually scripted in the Perso-Arabic script. Some of the most popular qisse are listed below.

 ‘Mirza Sahiba’ by Peelu
 ‘Heer Ranjha’ by Waris Shah
 ‘Sassi Punnun’ by Hasham Shah
 ‘Pooran Bhagat’ by Qadir Yar
 ‘Sohni Mahiwal’ by Fazal Shah Sayyad
 ‘Laila Majnu’
 ‘Shirin Farhad’
 ‘Dhol Sammi’
 ‘Kaulan’
 ‘Dulla Bhatti’
 ‘Yusuf and Zulaikha’ by Hafiz Barkhurdar

Gallery

See also
Punjabi literature
Punjabi folklore
Bengali Kissa

References

External links
 ApnaOrg offers one of the most reliable but largely incomplete list of Punjabi literature and music.
 Punjabi People & Old Stories Network of Punjabi People

Punjabi culture
Punjabi literature
Punjabi folklore
Indian folklore
Pakistani folklore